Someday is the third solo album by Susanna Hoffs. Reviews were positive: "Working with Nashville musician Andrew Brassell and producer Mitchell Froom, Hoffs creates an intimate and sweet album that frames her tender vocals with subtle arrangements that trade the jangle of the Bangles for an autumnally rich chamber pop sound."

Track listing

Personnel
Susanna Hoffs – vocals, harmony vocals, tambourine
Andrew Brassell – acoustic & electric guitars, harmony vocals, marimba
Val McCallum – acoustic & electric guitars (all tracks except 6)
Pete Thomas – drums & percussion (tracks 1-3, 7, 8, 10)
Davey Faragher – electric bass (tracks 1-3, 7, 8, 10)
Mike Campbell - 12-string guitar (track 7)
Michael Urbano – drums & percussion (tracks 4, 5, 9)
Bob Glaub – electric bass (tracks 4, 5, 9)
Mitchell Froom – keyboards
Dan Higgins – flutes, clarinets, saxophones
Hagai Izraeli – horns
Cris Woods – violin, viola
Adrienne Woods – cello
Orchestrations by Mitchell Froom
Recorded & mixed by David Boucher at Baroque Folk
Mastered by Roger Seibel at SAE Mastering

References

2012 albums
Susanna Hoffs albums